Piotr Nowakowski (born 18 December 1987) is a Polish professional volleyball player, a former member of the Poland national team. A participant in the Olympic Games (London 2012, Rio 2016, Tokyo 2020), two–time World Champion (2014, 2018), 2009 European Champion, and the 2012 World League winner. At the professional club level, he plays for Projekt Warsaw.

Personal life
Nowakowski was born in Żyrardów, but he grew up in Międzyborów. On July 25, 2015 he married Aleksandra Wilczewska. On January 1, 2017 he announced that he and his wife are expecting a first child. On June 12, 2017 his wife gave birth to their daughter Oliwia.

Career

Clubs
He made his debut in PlusLiga for club AZS Częstochowa. In the season 2007/2008 he became a key player for the team, and they won the Polish Cup and the silver medal in the Polish Championship. In 2011, he moved to Asseco Resovia Rzeszów. In 2012 he won silver medal in the CEV Cup 2012. In 2012 after seven years of domination by PGE Skra Bełchatów, he was part of the Asseco Resovia Rzeszów team that won the Polish Championship. The next year he and his team repeated this success and gained the title of Polish Champions 2013. In the 2013/2014 season, they won the Polish SuperCup 2013 and the silver medal in the Polish Championship 2013/2014 after losing the final (0-3 in matches) against PGE Skra Bełchatów. On March 29, 2015 Asseco Resovia Rzeszów, including Nowakowski, won the silver medal in the 2014–15 CEV Champions League. He was awarded Best Middle Blocker of the Final Four of the CEV Champions League. In April 2015 he signed a contract for the next two years, keeping him at Asseco Resovia Rzeszów till 2017. In April 2015 he achieved his third Polish Championship with Resovia. On April 28, 2017 he moved to LOTOS Trefl Gdańsk.

National team
Nowakowski was in the Polish squad when the Polish national team won the gold medal at the 2009 European Championship. On September 14, 2009 he was awarded the Knight's Cross of Polonia Restituta. The Order was conferred on the following day by the Prime Minister of Poland, Donald Tusk. On July 10, 2011 Nowakowski, with the national team, won the first medal of the World League for Poland in history. They won a bronze medal after winning the match with Argentina. Then Poland played at the European Championship 2011, where they had to defend the title of European Champion. Nowakowski was a major player in the team and Polish national team won a second medal in 2011 - a bronze after winning match with Russia. In November 2011 Poland won a silver medal at the World Cup and therefore qualified for the 2012 Olympic Games. On July 8, 2012 the Polish team won gold medal of the World League 2012. Nowakowski was a main player of the Polish team at the Olympic Games London 2012, but Poland lost a quarterfinal with Russia. On August 16, 2014 he was named in the World Championship squad for the World Championship held in Poland. On September 21, 2014 the Polish team won the title of World Champion 2014. On October 27, 2014, he received a state award granted by the Polish President, Bronisław Komorowski: the Officer's Cross of Polonia Restituta for outstanding sports achievements and worldwide promotion of Poland.

On September 30, 2018 Poland achieved title of the 2018 World Champion. Poland beat Brazil in the final 3-0 and defended the title from 2014. Nowakowski received an individual award for the Best Middle Blocker.

Honours

Clubs
 CEV Champions League
  2014/2015 – with Asseco Resovia
 CEV Cup
  2011/2012 – with Asseco Resovia
 National championships
 2007/2008  Polish Cup, with AZS Częstochowa
 2011/2012  Polish Championship, with Asseco Resovia
 2012/2013  Polish Championship, with Asseco Resovia
 2013/2014  Polish SuperCup, with Asseco Resovia
 2014/2015  Polish Championship, with Asseco Resovia
 2017/2018  Polish Cup, with Trefl Gdańsk

Individual awards

 2015: Polish Cup – Best Blocker
 2015: CEV Champions League – Best Middle Blocker
 2018: Polish Cup – Best Server
 2018: FIVB World Championship – Best Middle Blocker
 2021: Polish Championship – Best Blocker
 2021: CEV European Championship – Best Middle Blocker

State awards
 2009:  Knight's Cross of Polonia Restituta
 2014:  Officer's Cross of Polonia Restituta
 2018:  Commander's Cross of Polonia Restituta

References

External links

 
 Player profile at PlusLiga.pl   
 Player profile at Volleybox.net
 
 

1987 births
Living people
People from Żyrardów
Sportspeople from Masovian Voivodeship
Polish men's volleyball players
Olympic volleyball players of Poland
Volleyball players at the 2012 Summer Olympics
Volleyball players at the 2016 Summer Olympics
Volleyball players at the 2020 Summer Olympics
Polish Champions of men's volleyball
Knights of the Order of Polonia Restituta
Officers of the Order of Polonia Restituta
AZS Częstochowa players
Resovia (volleyball) players
Trefl Gdańsk players
Projekt Warsaw players
Middle blockers